Research Centre Imarat (RCI) is a DRDO laboratory located in Hyderabad, Telangana. The lab is responsible for Research and Development of Missile Systems, Guided Weapons and advanced Avionics for Indian Armed Forces. It was established by APJ Abdul Kalam in 1988. It is currently headed by U Raja Babu.

Background
The Research Centre Imarat is a global frontrunner in developing avionics and navigation systems for missiles. RCI is the leading laboratory which has successfully spearheaded the Indo-Israel joint development Medium Range Surface to Air Missile (MRSAM) programme and had hat-trick success in its first three consecutive missions.

References

Defence Research and Development Organisation laboratories
Research institutes in Hyderabad, India
1988 establishments in Andhra Pradesh
Research institutes established in 1988